Ferry pilot may refer to:
 a person engaged in Ferry flying
 Ferry Pilot (1941 film), a British documentary film from 1941
 Ferry Pilot (1942 film), a Canadian documentary film from 1942